Severtrans a.d. is an intercity bus company based in Sombor, Serbia. The company operates intercity coach services to various destinations in Serbia as well as several international destinations.

History

The company was founded in 1947 and began operating under the name "Severtrans" on December 13, 1966.

Privatization
In September 2007, controversial businessman Mile Jerković purchased Severtrans at a state-sponsored privatization auction in Novi Sad. In 2009 the Serbian state Agency for Privatization seized 53% of the company's assets from Jerković after he was sought after by the police for the suspicion of cooperating with Darko Šarić's drug cartel. Serbia's Agency for Privatization attempted to sell the company again in February 2012 without any success.

References

1947 establishments in Serbia
Bus companies of Serbia
Coach transport in Serbia
Companies based in Sombor
Economy of Vojvodina
Serbian brands
Transport companies established in 1947
Transport companies of Serbia